All-trans-octaprenyl-diphosphate synthase (octaprenyl-diphosphate synthase, octaprenyl pyrophosphate synthetase, polyprenylpyrophosphate synthetase, terpenoidallyltransferase, terpenyl pyrophosphate synthetase, trans-heptaprenyltranstransferase, trans-prenyltransferase) is an enzyme with systematic name (2E,6E)-farnesyl-diphosphate:isopentenyl-diphosphate farnesyltranstransferase (adding 5 isopentenyl units). This enzyme catalyses the following chemical reaction

 (2E,6E)-farnesyl diphosphate + 5 isopentenyl diphosphate  5 diphosphate + all-trans-octaprenyl diphosphate

This enzyme catalyses the condensation reactions resulting in the formation of all-trans-octaprenyl diphosphate.

References

External links 

EC 2.5.1